Emilio Lopez Adan (born 15 January 1946) is a doctor and Basque writer. He has published numerous works on Basque nationalism and the history of the Basque Country.

Life
Adán was born in Vitoria, Alava. During Franco's era, he was a member of ETA, from 1963 to 1974. At that time he was a "Pravi" and was a member of the Tactical Executive Committee (KET). From the Assembly held in 1966, he maintained a standalone attitude within the labor-internationalization. Since 1968 he has been living in exile. From 1969 he worked as a "Conflict". He signed the manifesto "Euskadi eta Askatasuna" (1970).

Works
Among his works include: El Nacionalismo Vasco (1876-1936), Mugalde, Henday (1974); El Nacionalismo Vasco y Clases Sociales (The Basque Nationalism and Social Classes) (1976) (Awarded in the book workshops of San Sebastián and Durango); The Basque Nationalism in exile (1936-1960) (1977); From Carlism to Bourgeois Nationalism (1978); Get Gordon Lainope (1982); Seventh daughter (1984), and a collection of ten stories set in different periods.

He has worked in various magazines, radio and television in support, culture, politics and society.

References

1946 births
Living people